Mateja Milovanović (born 18 April 2004) is a professional footballer who plays as a centre-back for Jong Ajax. Born in the Netherlands, he is a youth international for the Serbia U19s.

Personal life
Milovanović was born in Vlaardingen in 2004. His father Viktor Milovanović was playing for Sparta Rotterdam at the time. Mateja has captained the Netherlands at youth level but has eligibility for Serbia through his family.

Career
Milovanović signed a first professional contract with Ajax in 2021 to take him through to 2024. He had been with Ajax youth teams since 2018 when he switched from Sparta Rotterdam. He made his professional debut in the  Eerste Divisie for Jong Ajax in a 1-0 defeat against Roda JC Kerkrade on 12 August 2022.

International career
Having previously been called up for the under-15 and under-18 teams of the Netherlands, Milovanović made his debut for the Serbia under-19 team under manager Dejan Branković on June 7th, 2021 in a friendly fixture against Romania under-19 which resulted in a 1-0 victory at home.

Style of play
According to La Gazzetta dello Sport both AS Roma and S.S.C. Napoli were attracted to Milovanović as he was left footed, tall and strong but with good technique, they felt his style of play was comparable to Matthijs de Ligt.

References

External Links

 Netherlands U18 stats at OnsOranje

2004 births
Living people
People from Vlaardingen
Serbian footballers
Serbia youth international footballers
Dutch footballers
Dutch people of Serbian descent
Jong Ajax players
Eerste Divisie players